Niema Movassat (born 22 August 1984) is a German politician from The Left. He served as a member of the Bundestag from the state of North Rhine-Westphalia from 2009 to 2021.

Life 
Movassat was born in Wuppertal, North Rhine-Westphalia, as the son of an Iranian engineer and an Iranian radiographer. At the age of three his family moved with him to Oberhausen. Here he first attended the Adolf-Feld-Grundschule and in 2004 he passed his Abitur at the Elsa-Brändström-Gymnasium. He then studied law at the Heinrich-Heine-University in Düsseldorf, which he completed in April 2009 with the First Legal Examination as Diplom-Jurist. He became member of the bundestag after the 2009 German federal election. He is a member of the Committee on Legal Affairs and Consumer Protection. In June 2020, Movassat announced that he would not seek a fourth term and stood down at the 2021 German federal election.

References

External links 

  
 Bundestag biography 

1984 births
Living people
Members of the Bundestag for North Rhine-Westphalia
Members of the Bundestag 2017–2021
Members of the Bundestag 2013–2017
Members of the Bundestag 2009–2013
Politicians from Wuppertal
German politicians of Iranian descent
Members of the Bundestag for The Left